Rybak, sometimes written Ribak or Ryback) is a name and a surname meaning "fisherman" in Belarusian, Polish, Russian, and Ukrainian. It may refer to:

Surname 
 Alexander Rybak (born 1986), Belarusian-Norwegian singer-composer, violinist, pianist, writer, and actor
 Ewa Rybak (born 1974), female javelin thrower from Poland
 Ihor Rybak (1934-2005), Ukrainian weightlifter and Olympic champion
 Natan Rybak (1913-1978), Ukrainian writer 
 Paweł Rybak (born 1967), Polish professional footballer
 Pavel Rybak (born 1983), Belarusian professional footballer
 R. T. Rybak (born 1955), American mayor of Minneapolis, Minnesota
 Yury Rybak (born 1979), Belarusian judoka and Sambo wrestler
 Louis Leon Ribak (1902-1979), a Jewish American social realist and abstractionist painter
 Volodymyr Vasylyovych Rybak (born 1946), a member of Party of Regions, Chairman of the Verkhovna Rada
 Volodymyr Ivanovych Rybak (1971-2014), a member of Batkivshchyna, Horlivka city council representative
 Marcos Ribak (1928, Buenos Aires), a Jewish Argentinian writer (see Andrés Rivera)

See also
 
 Ryba
 Riba
 Rybakina

Occupational surnames
Russian-language surnames
Belarusian-language surnames
Polish-language surnames